Xin Baiqing (born 20 June 1973) is a Chinese actor best known for portraying Li Bai in Legend of the Demon Cat (2017) and Guan Xiaohe in Four Generations under One Roof (2010), which garnered him a Best Performance Award at the 2012 Golden Lion Award.

Early life and education
Xin was born in Chaoyang District, Beijing, on June 20, 1973. He entered the Central Academy of Drama in 1993, majoring in acting, where he graduated in 1997. At that same year, he was assigned to the National Theatre Company of China.

Acting career
Xin's first screen acting credit was Going into the Light and subsequently appearing on shows such as Up and Down of a Century (1997), Red Rock (1998), In the End (1999), My Dear Country (1999), and Deadly Encounter (1999).

His first film role was uncredited appearance in the film Because of Love (2000).

In October 2005, Xin starred with Sun Li, Deng Chao and Yin Tao in Happiness As Flowers, a romantic comedy television series directed by Gao Xixi. He portrayed Jiaqing Emperor in the biographical television series Jiaqing Emperor, based on the real life of Jiaqing Emperor in the Qing dynasty.

Xin starred as Zhao Jianping, a 35-year-old designer in Beijing, reuniting him with co-star Shirley Dai, who played his wife, a 30-year-old factory staff, in the drama film Hutong Days (2007). In the following year, he was cast in the film Glittering Days, playing the husband of Wu Yue's character.

From 2007 to 2012, he starred in many television series, such as Snowwolf (2007), Qiu Haitang (2007), Chinese Band of Brothers (2008), Marry and Settle Down (2009), Happy Memories of the Ma's (2010), The Password Of Happiness (2011), and Great Declaration of Wife (2012).

In 2012, Xin had a cameo appearance in The Last Tycoon, a period drama film starring Chow Yun-fat, Sammo Hung, Francis Ng and Huang Xiaoming.

Xin had a minor role as a school leader in Coming Home (2014), which premiere at the 2014 Cannes Film Festival.

In 2017, he had a supporting role in Chen Kaige's fantasy mystery film Legend of the Demon Cat, in which he played Li Bai, the most exceptional poet in the Tang dynasty.

On television in 2018, Xin played the lead role opposite Zhang Jiayi, Li Xiaoran, Song Dandan, and Niu Li in the romantic television series Beautiful Life.

Personal life
Xin married his university schoolmate Zhu Yuanyuan, who is also an actress. Their daughter was born in August 2008.

Filmography

Film

Television

Drama

Awards

References

External links
 
 Xin Baiqing on Douban 

1973 births
Male actors from Beijing
Living people
Central Academy of Drama alumni
Chinese male film actors
Chinese male television actors
Chinese male stage actors